Šepetys is a Lithuanian surname. It may also be written as Sepetys, Shepetys or Shepetis. Notable people with the surname include:
Lionginas Šepetys (1927–2017), Lithuanian politician
Ruta Sepetys, American writer of Lithuanian origin

Lithuanian-language surnames